Liam O'Connor (13 September 1955 – 2 December 2013) was an Irish Gaelic footballer who played as a full-back for the Offaly senior team.

Born in Walsh Island, County Offaly, O'Connor first arrived on the inter-county scene at the age of twenty-three when he first linked up with the Offaly senior team when he made his debut in the 1979 championship. O'Connor went on to play a key part for the Offaly defence over the next few years, and won one All-Ireland medal and three Leinster medals.  He was an All-Ireland runner-up on one occasion.

O'Connor was a member of the Leinster inter-provincial team on a number of occasions throughout his career, however, he never won a Railway Cup medal. At club level he was a two-time Leinster medallist with Walsh Island. He also won six successive championship medals with the club.

Throughout his career O'Connor made 20 championship appearances. His retirement came following Offaly's defeat by Louth in the 1986 championship.

References

1955 births
2013 deaths
Iarnród Éireann people
Offaly inter-county Gaelic footballers
Walsh Island Gaelic footballers
Winners of one All-Ireland medal (Gaelic football)